The marigold lorikeet or Sumba lorikeet (Trichoglossus capistratus) is a species of parrot that is endemic to the south-east Asian islands of Sumba, Rote, Wetar and Kisar (Indonesia) and Timor (Indonesia and East Timor). It was previously considered a subspecies of the rainbow lorikeet, but following a review in 1997, it is increasingly treated as a separate species.

Overall, the marigold lorikeet resembles a faded rainbow or scarlet-breasted lorikeet, with the blue to the head not as strongly demarcated and the chest ranging from orange-yellow to yellow. In addition to the nominate subspecies from Timor, it includes the subspecies fortis ("Edward's lorikeet") from Sumba and flavotectus ("Wetar lorikeet") from Wetar. It remains fairly common, but its relatively small distribution could give cause for future concern.

References

External links
 Marigold Lorikeet. Oriental Bird Images.

marigold lorikeet
Birds of the Lesser Sunda Islands
Birds of Timor
marigold lorikeet